Bashir Badr (born Syed Muhammad Bashir; 15 February 1935) is an Indian poet. He was teaching Urdu in  Aligarh Muslim University. He primarily writes in Urdu language particularly  ghazals. He also wrote a couplet titled Dushmani Jam Kar Karo in 1972 during Shimla Agreement that revolves around the partition of India. Badr's most of unpublished literary work, including uncertain poems was lost during the 1987 Meerut communal riots, and later he moved to Bhopal, Madhya Pradesh.

Early life and education 
He was born in United Provinces of British India (in modern-day [Faizabad now Ayodhya], Uttar Pradesh, India) on 15 February 1935. After he did his early schooling, he attended the Aligarh Muslim University where he did his Bachelor of Arts, Master of Arts and PhD. Later, he served at the same university as a lecturer. He also served at Meerut College for over seventeen years.

After his property such as house and books was damaged in 1987 Meerut violence, he permanently moved to Bhopal.

He is currently suffering from dementia and is believed to have forgot his Mushaira years as a result of dementia.

Career
He started writing poems at the apparent age of seven. He wrote some collection of ghazals titled Ikai, Kulliyate Bashir Badr, Aamad, Image, Aahat and Devanagari script ghazals titled Ujale Apni Yadon Ke. During his career, he wrote two books titled Azadi Ke Bad Urdu Ghazals Ka Tanqidi Mutala (Critical study of Urdu ghazal after independence) and Biswin Sadi Mein Ghazal (Ghazals in 20th century) focused on literary criticism.

He has also served at the Bihar Urdu Academy as a chairman.

Influence on politics 
His couplets appears to have influence on Indian politicians, and are sometimes quoted in the parliament of India by the leaders such as prime minister of India Narendra Modi and 2014's prime minister candidate of Congress Rahul Gandhi. In 1972, his couplet was quoted by Zulfikar Ali Bhutto.

Awards
Badr has received the Padma Shri award in 1999 for contribution towards literature and Sangeet Natak Akademi. He has also received the Sahitya Akademi Award in Urdu for his poetry collection "Aas" in 1999.

Legacy

Badr is one of the most quoted shayar in Indian pop-culture.

A popular radio show Ujaale Apni Yaadon Ke on Vividh Bharti derives its title from one of Badr's most popular sher.

ujāle apnī yādoñ ke hamāre saath rahne do
na jaane kis galī meñ zindagī kī shaam ho jaa.e 

The 2015 film Masaan contains various examples of poetry and shaayari by Basheer Badr, along with works by Akbar Allahabadi, Chakbast, Mirza Ghalib and Dushyant Kumar. Explaining this as a conscious tribute, the film's lyrics writer Varun Grover explained that he wanted to show 
the character of Shaalu (played by Shweta Tripathi) as a person whose hobby is to read Hindi poetry and shaayari, as this is a common hobby  of millennial and generation x youngsters in Northern India, especially when in love, but this aspect is rarely shown in Hindi films.

References

External links
 Official website
 Bashir Badr at Rekhta

Writers from Bhopal
People from Faizabad
People from Ayodhya
Urdu-language poets from India
Recipients of the Sahitya Akademi Award in Urdu
1935 births
Living people
Aligarh Muslim University alumni
20th-century Indian poets
Recipients of the Padma Shri in literature & education